The Field Elm cultivar Ulmus minor 'Hoersholmiensis', Hoersholm elm, originated from seed sown at the Hørsholm Planteskole, Denmark, c. 1885, where it was propagated by the nursery proprietor Lars Nielsen. The Späth nursery of Berlin, however, which marketed 'Hoersholmiensis' in the interwar period, considered it a hybrid rather than a form of field elm, a view shared by Christine Buisman, who in 1931 labelled a herbarium specimen from a Späth-sourced tree in The Hague as a form of Ulmus × hollandica.

Description
Upright-columnar in habit and rapid in growth when young, the tree becomes more globose with age. The leaves, 8 – 14 cm long by 3 – 5 cm wide, are lanceolate or narrowly obovate, acuminate at the tip and with a cuneate base, light green in colour, turning a deep yellow (sometimes following a brief orange-red) in autumn. The samara is heart-shaped, with marginal seed by a markedly open notch.

Pests and diseases
'Hoersholmiensis' is susceptible to Dutch elm disease and Coral-spot Fungus Nectria cinnabarina.

Cultivation
The tree is cultivated in Denmark, Sweden, Finland, and the Netherlands. In Denmark it is usually propagated by base-grafting on wych elm; here the oldest known plantation was 65 trees on the Tuborgvej, Copenhagen, planted in 1906. The Späth nursery of Berlin distributed 'Hoersholmiensis' from the late 1920s. In the Netherlands it was planted notably along the Westlandsgracht in Amsterdam where it still survives, although upper branches are often killed by Coral-spot Fungus. Heybroek, having observed in 1957 its wind-resistance in Schleswig-Holstein, included Hoersholm elm in his breeding programme (see 'Hybrid cultivars' below). Fontaine confirmed it a useful wind-break tree. The tree was briefly propagated and marketed in the UK by the Hillier & Sons nursery, Winchester, Hampshire, from 1974 to 1977, during which time 187 were sold.

Notable trees
Fine unpruned specimens stand in Stockholm, in Raoul Wallenberg square and the Karlaplan.

Hybrid cultivars
The tree was hybridized with 'Commelin' and U. pumila as part of the Dutch elm breeding programme at the De Dorschkamp Institute, Wageningen. Seeds arising from the crossing were donated by Hans Heybroek to the University of Wisconsin-Madison programme in 1960. The clone 'Regal' was a frost-hardy selection from the resultant seedlings, whilst the later 1984 USDA release 'Homestead' arose from the crossing of another with U. pumila.

Synonymy
Ulmus carpinifolia 'Hoersholm': Krüssmann, Handbuch der Laubgehölze 2: 534, 1962
Ulmus carpinifolia 'Hoersholmensis': Mededeeling, Comite inzake Bestudeering en Bestrijding van de Iepenziekte, 13: 10, 1933
Ulmus carpinifolia 'Hoersholmii': Plant Buyer's Guide, ed. 6, 285, 1958
Ulmus carpinifolia var. horsholmii: Melville, Journal of the Linnean Society of London, Botany, 53: 88, 90. 1946

Accessions

Europe
Grange Farm Arboretum, Sutton St James, Spalding, Lincolnshire, UK. Acc. no. 1078.

Nurseries

Europe
Centrum voor Botanische Verrijking vzw, Kampenhout, Belgium, (as Ulmus minor 'Hoersholm').
Noordplant , Glimmen, The Netherlands
De Reebock , Zwalm, Belgium

References

External links
"Herbarium specimen - 2683300" New York Botanical Garden Steere Herbarium Sheet labelled Ulmus 'Hoersholmiensis' NYBG specimen, from Späth nursery (1934)
  Juvenile long shoot; sheet labelled Ulmus hollandica Miller var. horsholmiensis; Den Haag 1931 specimen, from Späth

Field elm cultivar
Ulmus articles with images
Ulmus